Mukesh Bhakar (born 20 November 1988) is an Indian politician. He is a Member of the Legislative Assembly from Ladnun constituency of Nagaur district. He was president of the Rajasthan Youth Congress. He represents Ladnun in the Rajasthan Legislative Assembly since 2018 As a member of Indian National Congress. Bhakar served as state president of the National Students Union of India from 2013 to 2015, which is student wing of Indian National Congress party. He was elected state president of Rajasthan Shooting Ball Association.

Early life 
Mukesh Bhakar hails from a common Jat family. His father served Indian Army as a subedar. Bhakar completed his graduation and post graduation from the University of Rajasthan. He was influenced by the ideology of Bhagat Singh at a very young age and was actively engaged in social political work even as a student.

Political life 
In 2013, Bhakar won the election for the State President of National Students' Union of India. He successfully organised Congress's Student Wing in the state. NSUI made come back after 12 years in the largest university in Rajasthan under his leadership. After completion of his tenure he was nominated to be the national secretary. He contested his first election for Rajasthan Legislative assembly in 2018 for Ladnun assembly and won by a margin of 12,947 votes to his closest opponent three times MLA Thakur Manohar Singh of Bharatiya Janata Party. In February 2020, Bhakar won the election for the state president of Indian Youth Congress, Rajasthan, beating his nearest rival Amardeen by 9872 votes.

Positions held

References

External links
 
 

1988 births
Living people
University of Rajasthan alumni
Indian National Congress politicians from Rajasthan
Rajasthani politicians
Rajasthan MLAs 2018–2023
People from Nagaur district